The Uttarakhand cricket team is a cricket team that represents the state of Uttarakhand in Indian domestic competitions.

Background
In July 2018, the Board of Control for Cricket in India (BCCI) named the team as one of the nine new sides that would compete in domestic tournaments for the 2018–19 season, including the Ranji Trophy, the Vijay Hazare Trophy and the Syed Mushtaq Ali Trophy.

Coaches

Current squad

Updated as on 31 January 20223

Competitive record

In September 2018, they lost their opening fixture of the 2018–19 Vijay Hazare Trophy, to Bihar, by 5 wickets. In the Plate Group fixture between Uttarakhand and Sikkim, Karn Kaushal made the first double-century in the history of the Vijay Hazare Trophy, scoring 202 runs.

In their first season in the Vijay Hazare Trophy, they finished in second place in the Plate Group, with seven wins and one loss from their eight matches. Karn Kaushal finished as the leading run-scorer, with 489 runs, and Deepak Dhapola was the leading wicket-taker for the team, with eleven dismissals.

In November 2018, in their opening match of the 2018–19 Ranji Trophy, they beat Bihar by ten wickets. They went on to win the Plate Group and advanced to the quarter-finals of the tournament. However, in their quarter-final match they lost to Vidarbha by an innings and 115 runs to be knocked out of the tournament.

In March 2019, Uttarakhand finished third in Group E of the 2018–19 Syed Mushtaq Ali Trophy, with four wins from their seven matches. Karn Kaushal was the leading run-scorer for the team in the tournament, with 176 runs, and Sunny Rana was the leading wicket-taker, with nine dismissals.

See also
India national cricket team
Uttarakhand women's cricket team
Cricket Association of Uttarakhand
Cricket in India
Uttarakhand football team

References

Indian first-class cricket teams
Cricket in Uttarakhand
2018 establishments in Uttarakhand
Cricket clubs established in 2018